Hockings and Palmer was an architectural partnership of Edwin Morton (Ted) Hockings  and Leslie Tarween Palmer from 1916 until 1938. Their business was based in Rockhampton, Queensland, Australia. Some of their works are now heritage-listed.

Significant works 
Medical Superintendent's Residence and Therapies Block at the Rockhampton Hospital
Rockhampton War Memorial

References

Architects from Rockhampton